RGtk2 is a set of R wrappers for the GTK+ graphical user interface library. RGtk2 is free software and licensed under the GPL.

Syntax 
The code below will produce a 200x200 pixel window with the words "Hello World" inside.

library(RGtk2)

createWindow <- function()
{
    window <- gtkWindow()

    label <- gtkLabel("Hello World")
    window$add(label)
}

createWindow()
gtk.main()

Notable applications that use RGtk2 
RGtk2 has been used in a number of notable applications, some examples:

 Rattle
 RQDA

See also 

 R (programming language) (The R statistical programming language)

References

External links
 RGtk2 Homepage
 RGtk2 Package on CRAN
github

GTK language bindings
Free R (programming language) software
Articles with example R code